Mørkhøj is a suburb 10 km northwest of central Copenhagen, Denmark. Mørkhøj is part of Gladsaxe Municipality. The area is mixed with single-family homes and public housing and light industry. 

The popular Danish children's TV-show Bamses billedbog was recorded in the Gyngemosen area of Mørkhøj, at the time a forest area, which has since been turned in to an apartment complex. The chimney of the main character Bamses house can be found in the kindergarten Børnehuset Solstrålen, which previously also had the door to the house, which has since been vandalised, and later stolen.

Mørkhøj has two primary schools, Enghavegård skole, and Mørkhøj skole, as well as a teacher's college, called Blaagaard Seminarium

Geography of Copenhagen
Gladsaxe Municipality